Andy Brassell is an English writer and broadcaster.

Brassell specialises in European football and works as a pundit across many forms of media for the likes of  
Talksport, the BBC, BT Sport, and ESPN as well as newspapers such as the Guardian, The Independent, The Daily Mirror and the Daily Star and magazines such as The Blizzard (magazine), FourFourTwo, and contributing to the website for Premier League club Tottenham Hotspur, and Arsenal fan TV.

On the BBC Brassell regularly contributes to BBC Radio 5 Live Monday Night Club, and the European football show. He was previously a regular on Up all night's World Football Phone-In .

On talkSPORT he regularly features on Trans Europe Express with Danny Kelly , a show on every Sunday night from 9PM looking back at the weekend's European football action.

For The Football Ramble Brassell contributes weekly to their ‘On The Continent’ podcast with James Horncastle.

As well as appearing on Football Weekly podcast after the post-James Richardson (presenter) split, he has also appeared on the new Richardson venture The Totally Football Show.

Personal life
Brassell is a fan of AFC Wimbledon. When asked by FourFourTwo Brassell chose as his favourite football book Morbo by Phil Ball (2001), a book about rivalry and the historical and societal contexts of Spanish football.

References

English sports journalists
English podcasters
Television personalities from London